Eli Holzman (born March 30, 1974) is an American creator–developer, writer, producer and television executive known for creating or serving as executive producer on a number of reality-based television series and documentaries, such as Project Runway, Project Greenlight, The Seven Five, Undercover Boss, Leah Remini: Scientology and the Aftermath, Free Meek, Living Undocumented, American Idol and So You Think You Can Dance. Holzman is the CEO of The Intellectual Property Corporation, which he founded in 2016, as well as the President of Sony Pictures Television Nonfiction. As CEO of IPC, Holzman oversees the company’s day-to-day operations and its diverse slate of series, features, and projects in development across broadcast, cable and the major streaming services. As President of SPT Nonfiction, Holzman oversees the independent production companies which form the SPT Nonfiction group: 19 Entertainment & 19 Recordings, Sharp Entertainment, B17 Entertainment, Maxine, This Machine Filmworks, This Radicle Act Productions, Trilogy Films, House of Non-Fiction, and The Intellectual Property Corporation.

Holzman is the former head of Miramax Television, Ashton Kutcher's Katalyst Films, Studio Lambert and All3Media America. He has won four Primetime Emmy Awards for the television series' Leah Remini: Scientology and the Aftermath and Undercover Boss, and is the recipient of multiple Emmy Nominations for series' including Project Greenlight, Project Runway, and United Shades of America. Holzman has received multiple Producers Guild of America Awards nominations, and won the PGA Award for Outstanding Producer of Non-Fiction Television for Scientology and the Aftermath in 2016.

Career

Miramax 
Film (1996–1998)

After graduating from The Bronx High School of Science, Eli Holzman began his career at Miramax Films in early 1996. There, he worked on numerous films, including In Too Deep and Rounders. Holzman was soon promoted to junior executive, working for top exec Meryl Poster. As a junior executive, he identified television as an untapped market for the studio.

Television (1998–2005)

Holzman moved to Los Angeles in 1998 to play a role in founding Miramax's television arm, Miramax Television. While there, he helped develop a wide variety of projects, covering the full breadth of genres, including Kevin Smith's Clerks: The Animated Series, Kevin Williamson's Wasteland for ABC, Glory Days for The WB and The Nanny Diaries.  Holzman's first major unscripted hit series came after he developed and produced the HBO series Project Greenlight with Ben Affleck and Matt Damon, helping to drive the initial boom in popularity for reality television shows. He was soon promoted to the top executive position at Miramax Television where he created the popular show Project Runway, which has run for 17 seasons to date and currently airs on Bravo in the United States.

Kataylst Films 
After his departure from Miramax, Holzman was hired in 2005 as president of Ashton Kutcher's production company Katalyst Films, best known for the MTV prank series Punk'd. In 2005, Holzman developed and launched the reality television show Beauty and the Geek and developed Katalyst's inaugural slate of scripted programming.

Independent producer
In 2006, Holzman left Katalyst to become an independent producer. While independent, he created and/or executive produced such primetime reality shows as the CW reality series Stylista, along with Desiree Gruber, Jane Cha, Tyra Banks and Ken Mok. Holzman was inspired to create Stylista after a meeting with Anna Wintour. Holzman also served as the executive producer on the first two seasons of the G4 reality series The Block. In 2009, he co-created Bravo reality series Work of Art: The Next Great Artist with Sarah Jessica Parker.

Studio Lambert
Holzman founded and ran Studio Lambert's American business when it was launched in 2008, serving as the company's president. He was recruited for the role by reality television executive Stephen Lambert. Lambert and Holzman's first collaboration was the CBS reality show Undercover Boss, which premiered to 38.7 million viewers after the Super Bowl, the largest audience ever for a new series following the Super Bowl. The show went on to earn two Primetime Emmy Awards. In November 2010, Holzman and Lambert published a book entitled Undercover Boss: Inside the TV Phenomenon That Is Changing Bosses and Employees Everywhere.

While at Studio Lambert USA, Holzman oversaw and launched a variety of other reality shows, including The Pitch for AMC, Consumed for CNBC, The People's Couch for Bravo, The Million Second Quiz for NBC, Weed Country and Outlaw Empires for Discovery, Trouble Next Door for OWN, Be The Boss for TNT, Rat Bastards and Diamond Divers for Spike,  Mel B: It's a Scary World for Style Network, Fairy Jobmother and Supermarket Superstar for Lifetime, Mystery Millionaire for WEtv, Model Employee for Vh1, and Southern Fried Stings for TruTV.

All3Media America 
In 2013, Studio Lambert USA merged with the other Los Angeles-based production companies owned by British super-indie All3Media to form All3Media America. Holzman oversaw the operation which housed production companies including Studio Lambert USA, Maverick, Objective, Lime Pictures, Morocco Junction, MME/Filmpool, and Zoo Productions. Holzman also launched All3Media's American scripted television operation. Series produced under the various All3Media America companies included Make Me a Millionaire Inventor for CNBC, Slednecks for MTV, True Tori for Lifetime, Chrisley Knows Best for USA, Hot Grits for Vh1, Work Out New York for Bravo, and United Shades of America and Declassified: The Untold Stories of American Spies for CNN.

In 2014, Holzman executive produced the critically acclaimed documentary The Seven Five, chronicling the misdeeds of the infamous, corrupt NYC cop Michael Dowd. The documentary is currently being adapted into a scripted feature by Sony Pictures and Annapurna, with Holzman producing.

The Intellectual Property Corporation (IPC) 
In 2016, Holzman left All3Media America to found and launch The Intellectual Property Corporation (IPC), assuming the role of CEO. Aaron Saidman, previously the EVP of All3Media America, joined him as co-founder and president. The company was financed by private equity investors, Sheldon Yellen, Michael G. Rubin, and David J. Adelman. Yellen and Rubin had both previously appeared on Undercover Boss.

IPC soon went into production on its inaugural series, Leah Remini: Scientology and the Aftermath for A&E, and was the television network's highest rated premiere in two years. The series became a commercial and critical success, winning a Primetime Emmy Award in 2017.

At IPC, Holzman has created and produced a broad range of unscripted television series, including Living Undocumented for Netflix, Free Meek and This Giant Beast That Is The Global Economy for Amazon, The Substitute and America's Most Musical Family for Nickelodeon, Kingpin for History, Active Shooter: America Under Fire for Showtime, Mind Field for YouTube Premium, Sticker Shock for Discovery, and the critically acclaimed feature documentary Operation Odessa, which currently holds a "100% Fresh" rating on Rotten Tomatoes.

In 2017, The Hollywood Reporter included Holzman and Saidman on their list of "Reality TV's Ruling Class: The Top 10 Players of 2017." In 2019, it was announced that Holzman would serve as a producer on the HBO drama series Dirty Thirty, created by Courtney Kemp. The project is currently in development.

In May 2021, Deadline announced Holzman will be the executive producer of The D'Amelio Show.

Industrial Media 
In 2018, Core Media acquired The Intellectual Property Corporation and immediately relaunched as Industrial Media, with Holzman assuming the role of CEO and board member, while remaining the CEO of IPC. Aaron Saidman became president of Industrial Media, while remaining the president of IPC. Comprising 19 Entertainment, Sharp Entertainment, B17, and The Intellectual Property Corporation, Industrial Media had over 40 series on 20 different networks at launch.

Industrial Media has since entered deals with production companies including RJ Cutler's This Machine and Don Cheadle's Radicle Act.

As CEO of Industrial Media, Holzman also serves as an executive producer on ABC's American Idol, and FOX's So You Think You Can Dance.

Sony Pictures Entertainment 
In March 2022, Sony Pictures Entertainment acquired Industrial Media and Holzman was named President of Sony Pictures Television Nonfiction. As President of SPT Nonfiction, Holzman oversees the independent production companies which form the SPT Nonfiction group: 19 Entertainment & 19 Recordings, Sharp Entertainment, B17 Entertainment, Maxine, This Machine Filmworks, This Radicle Act Productions, Trilogy Films, House of Non-Fiction, and The Intellectual Property Corporation.

Entrepreneurial endeavors 
In 2008, Holzman invented the frozen novelties Q-Bee Treats, rice crispy treats and brownies filled with ice cream. The novelties were sold nationwide in stores such as Whole Foods and Safeway. In 2010, Holzman became a founding and managing partner of The Meatball Shop restaurant group. In 2014, he became a founding partner of Itani Ramen in Oakland, California. Both restaurants were partnerships led by Holzman's brother, celebrity chef Daniel Holzman.

Personal life
Holzman lives in Venice Beach, California, with his wife Stephanie Holzman. They have two children.

Awards

Primetime Emmy Award wins

2012: Outstanding Reality Program – Undercover Boss
2013: Outstanding Reality Program – Undercover Boss
2017: Outstanding Informational Series or Special – Leah Remini: Scientology and the Aftermath
2020: Outstanding Hosted Nonfiction Series Or Special – Leah Remini: Scientology and the Aftermath

Primetime Emmy Award nominations

2002: Outstanding Non-Fiction Program – Project Greenlight
2004: Outstanding Reality Program - Project Greenlight
2005: Outstanding Reality Program – Project Runway
2005: Outstanding Reality Program – Project Greenlight
2010: Outstanding Reality Program – Undercover Boss 
2011: Outstanding Reality Program – Undercover Boss
2014: Outstanding Structured Reality Program - Undercover Boss
2015: Outstanding Structured Reality Program - Undercover Boss
2016: Outstanding Unstructured Reality Program - United Shades of America
2018: Outstanding Informational Series or Special - Leah Remini: Scientology and the Aftermath
2019: Outstanding Informational Series or Special - Leah Remini: Scientology and the Aftermath

Critics' Choice Real TV Awards wins

 2022: Outstanding Achievement in Nonfiction Production: The Intellectual Property Corporation
 2022: Best Crime/Justice Show: Secrets of Playboy
 2022: Best Culinary Show: 'Cooking With ParisCritics' Choice Real TV Awards nominations

 2021: Outstanding Achievement in Nonfiction Production: The Intellectual Property Corporation 2022: Best Unstructured Series: We're HereMTV Movie & TV Awards wins

 2021: Best New Unscripted Series: Selena + Chef 2022: Best Lifestyle Show: Selena + Chef 2022: Best New Unscripted Series: The D'Amelio ShowMTV Movie & TV Awards nominations

 2022: Best Reality Return: Cooking With ParisNews & Documentary Emmy Award nominations

 2018: Outstanding Social Issue Documentary: Active Shooter: America Under Fire 2020: Outstanding Editing: Documentary: Living UndocumentedDaytime Emmy Award nominations

 2019: Outstanding Education or Informational Series – Mind Field 2018: Outstanding Education or Informational Series – Mind FieldFilm Independent Spirit Awards nominations

 2021: Best New Non-Scripted or Documentary Series – We're HereProducers Guild of America Award wins

 2018: Outstanding Producer of Non-Fiction Television – Leah Remini: Scientology and the AftermathProducers Guild of America Award nominations

2003: Television Producer of the Year Award in Reality/Game/Informational Series – Project Greenlight2004: Television Producer of the Year Award in Reality/Game/Informational Series – Project Greenlight2011: Outstanding Producer of Non-Fiction Television – Undercover Boss2012: Outstanding Producer of Non-Fiction Television - Undercover Boss2019: Outstanding Producer of Non-Fiction Television - Leah Remini: Scientology and the AftermathRealscreen Awards Award wins

2020: Non-Fiction - Crime & Investigation Program - Kids Behind Bars: Life or Parole2021: Non-Fiction - Arts & Culture Program - Free Meek2022: Lifestyle - Studio-based Food Program - Selena + ChefRealscreen Awards Award nominations

2022: Reality - Structured Reality - Selena + ChefInternational Documentary Association Award nominations

2016: Best Episodic Series - United Shades of America2019: Best Episodic Series - Kids Behind Bars: Life or Parole2019: Best Episodic Series - Living Undocumented2021: Best Episodic Series - We're HereGLAAD Media Awards Award wins
2021: Outstanding Reality Program - We're HereTelevision Critics Association Awards Award wins

2017: Outstanding Achievement in Reality Programming - Leah Remini: Scientology and the AftermathTelevision Critics Association Awards Award nominations

2020: Outstanding Achievement in Reality Programming - We're HereIDA Awards Award nominations
2021: Best Episodic Series - We're HereTaste Awards Award wins

2021: Best Home Chef in a Series - Selena + Chef2022: Best Home Chef in a Series - Selena + ChefFilmography

Executive producer

2001: Project Greenlight2004: Project Runway2005: Beauty and the Geek2007: The Block2008: Stylista2009: Fabulously Richie2010: Southern Fried Stings2010: Undercover Boss2010: Work of Art: The Next Great Artist2010: The Fairy Jobmother2010: Mel B: It's a Scary World2010: Dance Complex2012: Outlaw Empires2012: Diamond Divers2012: Rat Bastards2012: Be The Boss2012: Supermarket Superstar2013: Trouble Next Door2013: Weed Country2013: The Million Second Quiz2013: The Pitch2013: The People's Couch2013: Goin' Pearl Crazy2014: Make Me a Millionaire Inventor2014: Mystery Millionaire2014: Slednecks2014: True Tori2014: Chrisley Knows Best2014: The Seven Five2015: Hot Grits2015: Consumed: The Real Restaurant Business2015: Work Out New York2016: True Life2016: United Shades of America2016: Leah Remini: Scientology and the Aftermath2017: Mind Field2017: Active Shooter: America Under Fire2018: Operation Odessa2018: Kingpin2018: Sticker Shock2018: Cults and Extreme Belief2018: The Price of Duty2018: Lost Gold2019: Deadly Cults2019: This Giant Beast That Is The Global Economy2019: Kids Behind Bars: Life or Parole2019: Almost Ready2019: Injustice with Nancy Grace2019: Free Meek2019: Living Undocumented2020: Indian Matchmaking2021: The D'Amelio Show2021: Cooking with Paris''

Further reading
The Futon Critic: Interview with Eli Holzman (February 2010)
CNN: Eli Holzman on 'Undercover Boss' (November 2010)

References

External links

Television producers from New York City
Project Runway (American series)
Living people
1974 births
People from Manhattan